Wapello is an unincorporated community in Bingham County, in the U.S. state of Idaho.

History
A post office called Wapello was established in 1904, and remained in operation until 1908. The community was named after Wapello, an Indian chieftain.

References

Unincorporated communities in Bingham County, Idaho